Dennisiodiscus is a genus of fungi in the family Dermateaceae. The genus contains 10 species.

The genus name of Dennisiodiscus is in honour of Richard William George Dennis (1910 - 2003), British botanist (mycology) and plant pathologist.

The genus was circumscribed by Mirko Svrček in Ceská Mykol. Vol.30 on page 9 in 1976, and then in Kew Bull. Vol.31 (Issues 3) on page 415 in 1977.

See also 

 List of Dermateaceae genera

References

External links 

 Dennisiodiscus at Index Fungorum

Dermateaceae genera